Half-life is a mathematical and scientific description of exponential or gradual decay.

Half-life, half life or halflife may also refer to:

Film and television 
Half-Life (film), a 2008 independent film by Jennifer Phang
Half Life: A Parable for the Nuclear Age, a 1985 Australian documentary film
 "Half Life" (Medical Investigation), an episode of Medical Investigation

Literature 
 Half Life (Jackson novel), a 2006 novel by Shelley Jackson
 Half-Life (Krach novel), a 2004 novel by Aaron Krach
 Halflife (Michalowski novel), a 2004 novel by Mark Michalowski
 Rozpad połowiczny, a 1988 award-winning dystopia novel by Edmund Wnuk-Lipiński

Music 
Half Life (3 album) (2001)
Halflife (EP), an EP by Lacuna Coil and the title track
Half-Life E.P., an EP by Local H
 "Half Life", a song by 10 Years from The Autumn Effect
 "Half Life", a song by Prototype from the album Trinity
 Halflives, a French-Italian alternative rock band

Video games 
 Half-Life (series), a video game series developed by Valve
 Half-Life (video game), the first game in the series
 Half-Life 2 the second game in the series

See also
 Biological half-life, the time it takes for a substance to lose half of its pharmacologic, physiologic, or radiologic activity
 Effective half-life, the effective radioactive half-life in organisms after accounting for excretion